Solum is a term in soils science.

Solum may also refer to:
Solum, Norway, a former municipality in Telemark county
Solum Lake, a lake in Minnesota
Burdette Solum, a South Dakota politician
Gunnar Solum, a Norwegian politician
John Solum, a musician
Roger Solum, a South Dakota politician